Neil Sykes (born 17 December 1974) is an English former professional footballer who played as a midfielder.

Career
Sykes played in New Zealand with Central United, Auckland City and Waitakere City, appearing in the OFC Champions League and FIFA Club World Cup. He won the New Zealand Football Championship five times, and the OFC Champions League twice. In November 2010, Sykes made his 100th appearance in the ASB Premiership.

References

1974 births
Living people
English footballers
Sheffield Wednesday F.C. players
Association football midfielders